Haminoeoidea is a taxonomic superfamily of small sea snails or bubble shells, marine opisthobranch gastropod mollusks in the clade Cephalaspidea, the headshield slugs and bubble snails.

These cephalaspideans do have distinct anatomical and morphological characteristics, but unfortunately many species were described only from empty shells. For proper clarification of the taxonomy, those species still need the research necessary to provide a good description of the external and internal anatomy of the living animal.

Description of live animal

The soft parts of the animals can retract completely or partially into their shells, and yet this offers them scant protection, because the aperture is rather wide and there is no operculum. Furthermore, the shell is very fragile and can easily be crushed by a predator.

The cephalic shield of most species in this superfamily has two hind lobes that lie back on the front of the shell. The black eyes are usually buried just beneath the surface of the head.

Shell description

These bubble snails have thin, inflated shells ranging in shape from ovoid to flat and oval. They have an involute (sunken) spire.

Habitat
One can often find these bubble snails in enormous numbers, burrowing in mud on intertidal and sublittoral beds of green algae such as for example, the sea lettuce, Ulva lactuca.

Feeding habits
Haminoeid bubble snails are mostly herbivorous.

Predators
Their predators include species of carnivorous aglajids such as Navanax inermis.

Families, genera, species
Families, genera and species within the Haminoeoidea include:
 Superfamily Haminoeoidea
 Family Haminoeidae
 Family Bullactidae Thiele, 1926: synonym of Haminoeidae Pilsbry, 1895
 Genus Bullacta Bergh, 1901
 Bullacta exarata Philippi, 1848 – Distribution: China, Yellow Sea, Indo-Pacific
 Family Smaragdinellidae Thiele, 1925 – Oval yellow-green shell with sunken spire; very large aperture.
 Genus Phanerophthalmus A. Adams, 1850
 Phanerophthalmus cylindricus (Pease, 1861) – Distribution: Indo-Pacific, Hawaii
 Phanerophthalmus smaragdinus Ruppell & Leuckart, 1828 – Distribution: tropical Indo-West Pacific, Hawaii – Length: 16 mm – Description: herbivore with a rather small cephalic shield; small enclosed mantle cavity ending in an exhalant siphon; small shell is partially enclosed in the mantle; color: brown to purple.
 Genus Smaragdinella A. Adams & Reeve, 1848: synonym of Haminoeidae Pilsbry, 1895
 Smaragdinella algirae Forbes, 1844
 Smaragdinella calyculata Broderip & Sowerby 1829 – Distribution: Japan, Indo-Pacific – Length: 8 mm – Description: green mantle with dark green spots 
 Smaragdinella sieboldii A. Adams, 1864

References

 Rudman, W.B. (1972g) The herbivorous opisthobranch genera Phanerophthalmus A. Adams and Smaragdinella A. Adams. Proceedings of the Malacological Society of London, 40(3): 189-210, 11 figs.

External links
 Oskars T.R., Bouchet P. & Malaquias M.A. (2015). A new phylogeny of the Cephalaspidea (Gastropoda: Heterobranchia) based on expanded taxon sampling and gene markers. Molecular Phylogenetics and Evolution. 89: 130-150

Euopisthobranchia